

72001–72100 

|-id=012
| 72012 Terute ||  || "Terute" refers to an ancient legend from the Japanese city of Sagamihara in Kanagawa Prefecture, and involves a tragic love story. Remains dating back to the Paleolithic era have been found around the city. At the 2012 universe-themed festival, many citizens agreed on the name for this object. || 
|-id=021
| 72021 Yisunji ||  || Yi Sunji (1406–1465) was a Korean astronomer during the Chosun Dynasty who took Chosun's calendrical astronomy to the global level. His publication of two astronomy books, Chiljeongsan-naepyeon and Chiljeongsan-oepyeon enabled Chosun to carry out astronomical activities its own way. || 
|-id=037
| 72037 Castelldefels ||  || Castelldefels, a millenary city 30 km from Barcelona, visited by hundreds of thousands of tourists each year because of its beaches, good weather and historical monuments, including a castle inhabited since pre-Roman times. An active astronomical society maintains a close relationship with the Begues Observatory (Src). || 
|-id=042
| 72042 Dequeiroz ||  || José De Queiroz (born 1954) is a Portuguese-born, Swiss amateur astronomer and discoverer of minor planets. He lives in the small Alpine town of Falera with his daughter Marcia. || 
|-id=059
| 72059 Heojun ||  || Heo Jun (1539–1615), Korean medical scientist successfully integrated the medical traditions in Chosun and China through Donguibogam, a comprehensive oriental medicine textbook. His observation records regarding an epidemic of scarlet fever were some of the earliest and most accurate in the history of medicine. || 
|-id=060
| 72060 Hohhot ||  || Hohhot, capital city of the province of Inner Mongolia, China || 
|-id=071
| 72071 Gábor ||  || Dénes Gábor (1900–1979), a Hungarian-American physicist who  won the 1971 Nobel Prize for Physics for his invention and development of the holographic method. He also carried out research on high-speed oscilloscopes, communication theory and physical optics, and he paid special attention to the impact of science on modern society. || 
|}

72101–72200 

|-bgcolor=#f2f2f2
| colspan=4 align=center | 
|}

72201–72300 

|-bgcolor=#f2f2f2
| colspan=4 align=center | 
|}

72301–72400 

|-bgcolor=#f2f2f2
| colspan=4 align=center | 
|}

72401–72500 

|-id=432
| 72432 Kimrobinson ||  || Kim Stanley Robinson (born 1952), an American science fiction writer who has described human settlement of the Solar System and beyond. He has imagined social and environmental challenges facing societies living on worlds such as Mercury, Earth, Mars and the asteroids. || 
|-id=447
| 72447 Polińska || 2001 DP || Magdalena Polińska (born 1981) is a Polish assistant professor researcher at the Adam Mickiewicz University in Poznań. She specializes in photometric observations of minor solar system bodies. Her current research interests also include stellar spectroscopy and abundance analysis. Citation provided by T. Michałowski. || 
|}

72501–72600 

|-id=543
| 72543 Simonemarchi ||  || Simone Marchi (born 1973), an Italian astronomer and active researcher in Solar System sciences, in particular the observational and theoretical modelling of minor planets, satellites of the outer planets and meteoroid impacts on Mercury. He is also fond of sundials and engaged in the popularization of astronomy. || 
|-id=545
| 72545 Robbiiwessen || 2001 EP || Robbii Wessen (born 1958) is an American artist and graphic designer. He has won numerous graphic-design awards including the AIGA Graphic Design Award and multiple Desi Awards. His sculptures have been shown across the United States. He is a graduate of the Parsons School of Design. || 
|-id=596
| 72596 Zilkha ||  || Michael Zilkha (born 1954) and Nina Zilkha (born 1954), American entrepreneurs and philanthropists from Houston, Texas. Their chance visit to the George Observatory in the year 2000 led to a generous equipment grant, resulting in hundreds of discoveries of minor planets and of measurements of variable stars. || 
|}

72601–72700 

|-id=632
| 72632 Coralina ||  || Coralina is a women's choir founded in Gnosca, Switzerland in 1980, where the Gnosca Observatory is located. It has been masterfully conducted by Francesca Gianoni Casanova since 1990. The repertoire is highly refined and is made up of pieces from different parts of the world and from various periods of music history. || 
|-id=633
| 72633 Randygroth ||  || Randall Groth (Randy Groth) is an associate vice president of the University of Arizona and dean of the University's South Campus in Sierra Vista. His energetic efforts were a key factor in establishing Patterson Observatory at the South Campus. || 
|}

72701–72800 

|-bgcolor=#f2f2f2
| colspan=4 align=center | 
|}

72801–72900 

|-
| 72801 Manzanera ||  || Phil Manzanera (born 1951, as Philip Geoffrey -Adams) is a musician known for key contributions to such groups as Roxy Music, 801 and Quiet Sun, as well as the pursuit of his own, often experimental and ethereal guitar work. His work includes key collaborative efforts with Brian Eno, John Wetton, and David Gilmour. || 
|-id=802
| 72802 Wetton ||  || John Kenneth Wetton (1949–2017) was a progressive rock musician who worked with many groups during his long career, including Phil Manzanera, King Crimson, Roxy Music, U.K. and Asia. His beautiful voice complemented his equally impressive technical mastery of the bass guitar. || 
|-id=804
| 72804 Caldentey || 2001 GQ || Maria-Dolorès Caldentey Rius (born 1956), a Spanish founding member of the Observatorio Astronómico de Mallorca. In 1991 she designed and managed the construction of the observatory. During 2003–2004 she did the same for the Planetarium of Mallorca and the Observatorio Astronomico of La Sagra in Granada. || 
|-id=819
| 72819 Brunet || 2001 HX || Joseph Brunet (born 1935) a French astronomer  who was one of the three people involved in the construction of the Observatoire de Saint-Véran, following the decision to establish a new observing station by the Paris Observatory in 1974. || 
|-id=827
| 72827 Maxaub ||  || Max Aub (1903–1972), was a Franco-Spanish writer who studied in Spain, where the civil war inspired his famous trilogy Campo cerrado (Field of Honour, 1943), Campo de sangre (1945) and Campo abierto (1951), written during his 30-year exile in Mexico. || 
|-id=834
| 72834 Guywells ||  || Guy Wells (born 1976) is a British-Grenadian amateur astronomer and a Fellow of the Royal Astronomical Society. He has created Northolt Branch Astro, a group of amateur astronomers who seek to increase public interest in astronomy. He provides follow-up observations of Near Earth asteroids to the Minor Planet Center. || 
|-id=876
| 72876 Vauriot ||  || Pierre Vauriot (1926–1984) was a French professor of mathematics, an observer of variable stars and a popularizer of astronomy in the region Languedoc Roussillon. He was cofounder of the Astronomical Society of Montpellier and a correspondent of the Astronomical Society of France. || 
|}

72901–73000 

|-id=993
| 72993 Hannahlivsey ||  || Hannah Livsey (born 1975) is an English solicitor with a passion for classical music. She lends her time as a cellist to the Shrewsbury Symphony Orchestra. || 
|}

References 

072001-073000